"Gemini Dream" is a 1981 single by the progressive rock band The Moody Blues. It reached number 12 on the US Hot 100, as well as number 1 on the Canada RPM Top 100 Singles chart. It is ranked as the 28th biggest Canadian hit of 1981.

History
The song was the first of three singles released from the Moody Blues’ 1981 album Long Distance Voyager, which also included "Painted Smile", another track from the album, on the B-side. Two more songs from Long Distance Voyager, "The Voice" and "Talking Out of Turn", were subsequently released as singles after the album's release.

"Gemini Dream" was written jointly by the band's lead guitarist Justin Hayward and bassist John Lodge, both of whom won an ASCAP songwriting award for it. While Hayward and Lodge had collaborated on a duet album outside of the Moody Blues in 1975 called Blue Jays, "Gemini Dream" was the first song performed by the Moody Blues that they had written together.  On the studio recording, and most live performances, Hayward and Lodge sing lead vocals in harmony.

"Gemini Dream" was the first Moody Blues single to feature Patrick Moraz on keyboards. Moraz had replaced the original keyboardist Mike Pinder, who left the band shortly after completion of their previous album Octave for personal reasons. Moraz was hired to take Pinder's place in time for the Moody Blues' 1979 Octave World Tour. After the tour, Moraz was then retained as a permanent member of the band, and he recorded with them until 1991.

Most of the lyrics of "Gemini Dream" are about a rock band while touring.

Reception
Record World called the song a "majestic rocker with just a touch of disco." Ultimate Classic Rock critic Nick DeRiso rated it as the Moody Blues' 10th greatest song, calling it "a canny update of their core sound" and saying that it "set a template for the glossy-sheened prog-pop of Asia and the '80s-era retooled Yes."  Allmusic critic Dave Connolly felt that it "does sound dated in today's post-Xanadu landscape."

Chart performance

Weekly charts

Year-end charts

Personnel
 Justin Hayward – electric guitars, lead vocals
 John Lodge – bass guitar, lead vocals
 Ray Thomas – backing vocals
 Patrick Moraz – Yamaha CS80, Minimoog, Oberheim Custom double 8-voice synthesizer
 Graeme Edge – drums, percussion

References

External links
 

1981 singles
1981 songs
RPM Top Singles number-one singles
Song recordings produced by Pip Williams
Songs written by John Lodge (musician)
Songs written by Justin Hayward
The Moody Blues songs